Ohaw or rur is a savory soup of the Ainu people of northern Japan, flavored with fish or animal bones. Kelp is also used to add flavor to the stock. Unlike the majority of the traditional Japanese soups, the Ainu do not use miso or soy sauce in their soups. The solid ingredients such as meat, fish, vegetables and/or wild edible plants are added to the stock.

Variants
 cep ohaw - salmon soup
 kam ohaw - meat soup
 yuk ohaw - venison soup
 pukusa ohaw - pukusa soup
 pukusakina ohaw - anemone soup

See also
 List of Japanese soups and stews

References

Ainu cuisine
Japanese soups and stews